Grovetown is a city in Columbia County, Georgia, United States. It is part of the Augusta metropolitan area and the Central Savannah River Area. The 2019 population estimate was 15,152. The mayor is Gary Jones.

History

From the building of the Georgia Railroad, which travels through the city until at least the 1860s, the community was known as "Belair". The city was chartered by the Georgia Legislature and officially incorporated on January 1, 1881. The name of the small village purportedly came from the old Grove Baptist Church that was founded in 1808. A poet famous in the post-Civil War era, Paul Hamilton Hayne, moved to Copse Hill in the Parham Road area in the 1860s. He solicited the United States Postal Service to establish the Grovetown post office. The first U.S. mail service was inaugurated on September 28, 1877, with Charles Clifford as postmaster. Mr. Clifford was also the train depot agent and the owner of the corner store.

The first railroad depot was a small structure built in 1878–79. The last depot was an ornate structure built in 1891 at a cost of $5,041.74. It served the citizens of Grovetown until 1970, when passenger trains no longer traveled on the Augusta–Atlanta line. It was demolished in 1973.

Many wealthy and influential Augusta residents had summer homes in Grovetown, escaping the heat and disease of the city. They commuted on the old "Picayune" train, relying on its frequent service. The Rosland Hotel, later known as the "Eagle", was built in the 1880s. Its huge rotunda was frequently used for church gatherings, suppers, parties, and dances. It later became a boarding house and burned in the 1970s. The Church of Christ is now located on the site.

Several country stores were established on Old Wrightsboro Road near the railroad crossing. One was S. F. Poole's store, where the gazebo now stands at the corner with Robinson Avenue, with a "philosophers' bench" by the door. During the early days, many famous residents lived in the Grovetown area: Hayne, the literary figure; Stewart Phinizy and James Tobin, cotton brokers; Charles Phinizy, banker and railroad president; Dr. H. H. Steiner, physician; and John Dodge, pharmacist and harness racing enthusiast. Dodge brought his stable from Ohio and built a large home and racetrack.

With the construction of Camp Gordon in 1942, Grovetown experienced rapid growth; it was no longer a small agricultural town. Due to its close proximity to Fort Gordon, Many military families looked to Grovetown for housing. Gradually, more and more retired military saw the benefits of living in the small town and population began to grow and stabilize.

Annexation and multi-housing construction has increased the population of the formerly quiet town. Currently, Grovetown has a population of approximately 15,000, up from the 1990 census figure of 3,596. A variety of stores, dining establishments, schools, and churches add to the town's culture. Services include recreational facilities, a public safety department, two fire stations, water and sewer services, a senior center, and museum.

Geography
Grovetown is located in southern Columbia County.

Demographics

2020 census

As of the 2020 United States census, there were 15,577 people, 4,028 households, and 2,986 families residing in the city.

2010 census
As of 2019, there were 15,152 people and 4,028 households residing in the city. The racial makeup of the city was 61.3% White, 27.8% African American, 0.9% Native American, 0.7% Asian, 0.0% Pacific Islander, and 7.8% from two or more races. Hispanic or Latino of any race were 15.6% of the population.

In the city, the population was spread out, with 24.4% under the age of 18 and 8.1% who were 65 years of age or older.

The median income for a household in the city was $68,756. The per capita income for the city was $24,599.

Parks and recreation
City parks include the Liberty Park Community Center, and Goodale Park, which is named after Joseph Daniel "Danny" Goodale Jr., a Vietnam veteran who died in 1969.

Education
Grovetown Middle School, Grovetown Elementary School, and Cedar Ridge Elementary School are located in the city limits of Grovetown. Grovetown High School, Columbia Middle School, Brookwood Elementary School, and Euchee Creek Elementary School are located near the city. Baker Place Elementary School is also near the city.

Infrastructure

Transportation
Grovetown is mainly served by Georgia State Route 223 (SR 223), locally known as Robinson Avenue from just northwest of Fort Gordon's Gate 2 to the intersection with Harlem–Grovetown Road and as Wrightsboro Road past this point. It is also served by SR 388 east of this intersection. Here, SR 388 takes on the Wrightsboro Road name until an intersection with Katherine Street. At this intersection, the state highway turns left onto Horizon South Parkway, while Wrightsboro Road continues toward Augusta. Harlem–Grovetown Road connects the city with Harlem.

There are railroad tracks of CSX Transportation that extend through Grovetown, used mostly by freight trains.

See also

Central Savannah River Area

References

External links

 
Cities in Georgia (U.S. state)
Cities in Columbia County, Georgia
Augusta metropolitan area